Simon "J.J." Racaza (born April 16, 1980 in Cebu City, Philippines) is a Filipino-American sport shooter who took silver in the Open division at the 2011 IPSC Handgun World Shoot and silver in the Production division at the 2014 Handgun World Shoot. He was also the number one qualifier of the US Gold Team for the 2010  ISSF World Shooting Championships. In 2010, Racaza competed in season one of History Channel's Top Shot marksmanship competition, finishing in third place.

Racaza graduated from Seton Hall University with a degree in Business Management Information Systems. He currently works as an agent for the Department of Homeland Security. He is also a double Grand Master in the USPSA. Racaza is part of Team Limcat, a team of professional competitive shooters sponsored by the company of the same name. Limcat even designed a gun specifically for Racaza, called the Razorcat Racing Gun.

During one episode of the second season of the show, Racaza appeared with Blake Miguez as trainers for one of the challenges.

References

External links
J.J. Racaza Bio on History Channel
 

1980 births
Living people
IPSC shooters
ISSF pistol shooters
Sportspeople from Cebu City
People from New Milford, New Jersey
Seton Hall University alumni